Çapkın (Womanizer) is Candan Erçetin's second studio album. Most of the lyrics written by Mete Özgencil. The album sold 74,000 copies in Turkey. The song "Yalan" made a huge success all over Turkey.

Track listing

References

Candan Erçetin albums
1997 albums